Edinburgh railway station may refer to:

Edinburgh Gateway station
Edinburgh Park railway station
Edinburgh Princes Street railway station
Edinburgh Waverley railway station